The Municipality of Morris-Turnberry is a municipality in Huron County, Ontario, Canada. It is located in the north portion of Huron County, near the Bruce County border, southeast of Wingham.

It was formed as an amalgamation of the former Morris and Turnberry townships in 2001 in an Ontario-wide local government restructuring imposed by the government of that time. The two former townships now comprise the wards of the amalgamated municipality.

Morris-Turnberry's only significant settlement is Bluevale, located at the junction of Huron Roads 86 and 87 east of Wingham. This is where Elias Disney, father of Walt Disney, was born in 1859.  Sunshine is also located here.

Demographics 

Prior to amalgamation (2001):
 Population total in 1996: 3,504
 Morris (township): 1,732
 Turnberry (township): 1,772
 Population in 1991: 
 Morris (township): 1,725
 Turnberry (township): 1,582

See also
List of townships in Ontario

References

External links

Lower-tier municipalities in Ontario
Municipalities in Huron County, Ontario